The United Architects of the Philippines Student Auxiliary (UAPSA) is a student organization of the United Architects of the Philippines (UAP).

History 

UAPSA was established in 1989 as an arm and junior partner of United Architects of the Philippines. Jesus M. Reyes, then Vice Dean of the Central Colleges of the Philippines (CCP) College of Architecture and the 1989 President of UAP-Silangan Chapter, organized the first official UAPSA with 24 architecture students of CCP. Other schools that offers an architecture degree followed suit. Since then, UAPSA has been a duly-recognized student organization with 94 member schools and 16,000 members nationwide.

Member schools

References

External links 

 United Architects of the Philippines – Official website

Architecture-related professional associations
Student organizations in the Philippines
Student organizations established in 1989